There have been three baronetcies created for persons with the surname Noble, all in the Baronetage of the United Kingdom.

The Noble Baronetcy, of Ardmore and Ardardan Noble in Cardross in the County of Dumbarton, was created in the Baronetage of the United Kingdom on 24 July 1902 for the Scottish physicist and businessman Andrew Noble. The second Baronet was High Sheriff of Northumberland in 1918.

The Noble Baronetcy, of West Denton Hall in the County of Northumberland, was created in the Baronetage of the United Kingdom on 24 June 1921. For more information on this creation, see Baron Kirkley.

The Noble Baronetcy, of Ardkinglas, and Eilean Iarmain in the County of Argyll, was created in the Baronetage of the United Kingdom on 26 July 1923 for the businessman John Noble. He was the third son of the first Baronet of the 1902 creation. As of 2011 the presumed fourth and present Baronet is not enrolled on the Official Roll of the Baronetage.

The Conservative politician Michael Noble, Baron Glenkinglas, was the youngest son of the first Baronet of the 1923 creation.

Noble baronets, of Ardmore and Ardardan Noble (1902)

Sir Andrew Noble, 1st Baronet (1831–1915)
Sir George John William Noble, 2nd Baronet (1859–1937)
Sir Saxton William Armstrong Noble, 3rd Baronet (1863–1942)
Sir Humphrey Brunel Noble, 4th Baronet (1892–1968)
Sir Marc Brunel Noble, 5th Baronet (1927–1991) Sheriff of Kent, 1985
Sir David Brunel Noble, 6th Baronet (born 1961)

Noble baronets, of West Denton Hall (1921)
see Baron Kirkley

Noble baronets, of Ardkinglas and Eilean Iarmain (1923)

Sir John Henry Brunel Noble, 1st Baronet (1865–1938)
Sir Andrew Napier Noble, 2nd Baronet (1904–1987)
Sir Iain Andrew Noble, 3rd Baronet (1935–2010)
Sir Timothy Peter Noble, 4th Baronet (born 1943)

The presumed heir apparent is the son of the presumed 4th Baronet, Lorne Andrew Wallace Noble (born 1980)

Notes

References
Kidd, Charles, Williamson, David (editors). Debrett's Peerage and Baronetage (1990 edition). New York: St Martin's Press, 1990, 

Baronetcies in the Baronetage of the United Kingdom
Extinct baronetcies in the Baronetage of the United Kingdom